George C. Sellon (February 2, 1881—October 13, 1954) was the first state architect of California.

He designed a number of important works, including some which are listed on the National Register of Historic Places.

Works include:

California Building, Alaska-Yukon-Pacific Exposition, Seattle, WA 	1908-1909
California State Insectary (1908), Sacramento, CA 
Cottage #1, Cottage #2, and Cottage #3 (1908), at California Polytechnic School, San Luis Obsipo, CA
California-Western States Life Insurance Company, Headquarters Building (1924-1925), Central Sacramento, Sacramento, CA	
Colusa Unified School District, Colusa Union High School (1925–26), Colusa, CA	1926	Colusa	CA
State of California, Department of Corrections and Rehabilitation, Folsom State Prison (FSP), Represa, CA (built 1878–1880, modified ?)
Agnews Insane Asylum, 4000 Lafayette Ave. Santa Clara, CA Sellon & Hennings, McDougall, George 
Auburn City Hall and Fire House, 1103 High St. Auburn, CA Sellon, George Clinton 
Colusa High School and Grounds, 745 10th St. Colusa, CA Sellon, George C.
Cranston-Geary House, 2101 G St. Sacramento, CA Sellon, George C.
Lassen County Court House, Courthouse Square Susanville, CA Sellon, George C. (NPHS # 97001659)
Sonoma Developmental Center Main Building, 15000 Arnold Dr. Eldridge, CA Sellon & Hemmings 
Teacher Training School Building, San Diego State Normal School, 4345 Campus Ave. San Diego, CA Sellon, George C.
One or more works in the Jackson Downtown Historic District, Roughly along Main St. from 215 Main St. to 14 Broadway Jackson, CA Sellon, George C.
Grass Valley Veterans Memorial Building (1932) 
Nevada City Hall (1937)
Nevada County Courthouse (1936-1937), Downtown Historic District NRHP Reference #85002520
Nevada City Veterans Memorial Building (1953)
Auburn City Hall and Fire House (1935-1937), WPA project (NPHS # 11000935).
Truckee Veterans Memorial Building (1939), Truckee, NRHP, NPS 10-900 Application Approved April 2021 (NRHP # 100006720)
Tahoe Forest Hospital (original) (mid 1950s)

References

American architects
Architects from California
1881 births
1954 deaths